OMD may stand for:

Science
 Osteomodulin, extracellular matrix protein
 Organic matter digestibility
 Organic mental disorders
 Orofacial myological disorders, diseases affecting facial muscles
 Oromandibular dystonia, neurological disease
 3-O-Methyldopa, metabolite and drug
 Occult macular dystrophy, a rare genetic retinal disease

Entertainment and media
 Orchestral Manoeuvres in the Dark, an English electronic band
 OMD Worldwide, a global media agency network
 Orcs Must Die!, a strategy video game
 Spider-Man: "One More Day", a 2007 four-part Spider-Man comic book crossover storyline

Religion
Ordo Frati Excalceatorum de B.M.V. de Mercede, the Discalced Mercedarians, Catholic religious order
Clerics Regular of the Mother of God of Lucca members use the suffix of O.M.D.

 Ohio-Meadville District

Other uses
 Olympus OM-D series of digital cameras
One Million Degrees, a Chicago educational charity